Don Mann is a New Zealand rugby league footballer who represented New Zealand in the 1972 World Cup.

Playing career
Mann played in the Auckland Rugby League competition for both Glenora and Ponsonby United. In 1972, while playing for Ponsonby, Mann won the Hyland Memorial Cup as best coach in the Fox Memorial and in 1973 he won the Rothville Trophy as player of the year.

He represented Auckland and between 1971 and 1974 he played in Four Test matches for the New Zealand national rugby league team. This included the 1972 World Cup.

Personal life
Mann is from a big rugby league family. One of his sons, Duane, represented both Tonga and New Zealand while another, Don Jr, is the New Zealand Warriors operations manager. Two of his nephews, George and Esau, also played international rugby league.

References

Living people
New Zealand rugby league players
New Zealand national rugby league team players
New Zealand sportspeople of Tongan descent
Auckland rugby league team players
Glenora Bears players
Ponsonby Ponies coaches
Ponsonby Ponies players
New Zealand rugby league coaches
Rugby league props
Year of birth missing (living people)